The cinnamon-chested bee-eater (Merops oreobates) is a species of bird in the family Meropidae. They are found in Burundi, Democratic Republic of the Congo, Ethiopia, Kenya, Rwanda, South Sudan, Tanzania, and Uganda.

Description
The species measures  in length and weighs .The sexes are alike. They have bright green heads, upper parts, and tails; their chins and throats are yellow and outlined in black, with a white extension to the side; their breasts are cinnamon-brown, darkening towards the belly. When perched, their stance is upright with the tail pointing downward. The tail is blackish with an orange base and white tip when seen from the front, while from the back it is mainly green, with black edges visible when it is flared. This bird can be distinguished from the somewhat similar little bee-eater by their larger size, darker colouring, white cheek patches, and the upland habitat where they are found.

Ecology
Its diet consists mainly of honeybees although it also eat moths, butterflies, dragonflies, beetles, and other flying insects. It seems to be an adaptable species and able to withstand loss of its forest habitat.

Status
The cinnamon-chested bee-eater has a very wide range and although the population size has not been quantified, they are thought to be large, and the International Union for Conservation of Nature has assessed their conservation status as being of "least concern".

References

cinnamon-chested bee-eater
birds of East Africa
fauna of Kenya
fauna of Uganda
cinnamon-chested bee-eater
taxonomy articles created by Polbot